Ooij en Persingen is a former municipality in the Dutch province of Gelderland. It existed until 1818, when it was merged with Ubbergen.

It is named after the two villages Ooij and Persingen.

References

Former municipalities of Gelderland
Berg en Dal (municipality)